Mohamed Mansour Salah (born 1957) is a Qatari athlete. He competed in the men's decathlon at the 1984 Summer Olympics.

References

1957 births
Living people
Athletes (track and field) at the 1984 Summer Olympics
Qatari decathletes
Olympic athletes of Qatar
Place of birth missing (living people)
Athletes (track and field) at the 1982 Asian Games
Medalists at the 1982 Asian Games
Asian Games medalists in athletics (track and field)
Asian Games bronze medalists for Qatar